Diego Rafael Castaño (born June 8, 1979 in Bragado) is an Argentine football midfielder who plays for Tigre.

Career

Castaño started his career in the lower leagues of Argentine football, playing for 9 de Julio de Buenos Aires and then Rivadavia de Lincoln before signing for Tigre in 2004.

Castaño has been part of Tigre's rise through the divisions, his first season with the club saw them win the Apertura and the Clausura to secure promotion to the Argentine 2nd division. In 2007 the club were promoted to the Argentine Primera.  The Apertura 2007 was Tigre's first season in the Primera since 1980, and Castaño's first taste of top flight football. Castaño was a key member of the first team, playing in nearly all of Tigre's games. The club finished in 2nd place which was the highest league finish in their history.

References

External links
 Football-Lineups player profile
 Tigre player profile 

1979 births
Living people
Sportspeople from Buenos Aires Province
Argentine footballers
Association football midfielders
Club Atlético Tigre footballers